Sher Mohammed Akhundzada (also known as Sher Ahmed Akhundzada) is a tribal leader who was the Governor of Helmand in Afghanistan from 2001 to 2005.

Early life 
Sher Mohammed was born to the Akhundzada family in northern Helmand province, which played an important role in the Soviet–Afghan War. Belonging to the main tribe of Helmand, the Alizais, they hailed from the district of Musa Qala. His uncle was Mohammad Nasim Akhundzada who became a leading jihadi commander in Helmand.  After Nasim was assassinated in 1990, his brother Rasul Akhundzada (Sher Mohammad's father) became governor of Helmand. Another brother, Abdul Ghafar Akhundzada, became governor when Rasul died of cancer. Abdul Ghafar was assassinated in Quetta, Pakistan on 18 March 2000.

Governor of Helmand 

Sher Mohammed Akhundzada was appointed as Governor by the President Hamid Karzai in 2001 and served until 2005.

Talking to journalists in Kabul, Sher Muhammad Akhundzada claimed that while he was governor of Helmand for four years, NATO did not drop a single bomb on the province, no civilians were killed, and no districts fell to the Taliban. "If I were still there, I am sure things would be the same as before."

He identified  agricultural projects to be implemented in Helmand such as excavation of a canal from the Kajaki dam to irrigate northern Helmand, construction of an intake on Musa Qala River to irrigate the arable lands and generate electricity, and construction of an intake on Helmand river in Kamal Khan to irrigate unproductive farms.

Sher Mohammad was also deeply involved in the production and smuggling of opium.

In June 2005 Sher Mohammad's compound was raided by US forces, which claimed to have found a large stash of opium. Britain—which had been designated the "lead nation" for counter-narcotics activities in Afghanistan—successfully lobbied for Sher Muhammad's deposition before deploying ISAF forces to Helmand.

2009 Presidential election 

During the 2009 presidential election, Akhundzada and Ahmed Wali Karzai, a half-brother of the incumbent president, were accused of buying up voter registration cards in Helmand Province.

References 

Governors of Helmand Province
Year of birth missing (living people)
Living people